The 2020 NXT: The Great American Bash was the eighth Great American Bash professional wrestling event produced by WWE, and 22nd Great American Bash event overall. It was held exclusively for wrestlers from the promotion's NXT brand division. The event aired as a two-part special episode of WWE's weekly television series NXT, broadcast on the USA Network. The event was taped on July 1, 2020, at the Capitol Wrestling Center, hosted at the WWE Performance Center in Orlando, Florida. The first part aired that night on July 1 while the second part aired on tape delay on July 8. It was the first Great American Bash event held since 2012 as well as the first to air as an annual television special of NXT.

Production

Background
The Great American Bash is a professional wrestling event established in 1985. Following WWE's acquisition of World Championship Wrestling (WCW) in March 2001, the promotion revived the event as their own annual pay-per-view (PPV) in 2004. The event continued until 2009. Following this 2009 event, The Great American Bash was discontinued as a PPV. In 2012, WWE revived the event to be held as a special episode of SmackDown, but was again discontinued. On June 24, 2020, however, WWE announced that the eighth Great American Bash under the WWE banner, and 22nd overall, would take place as a special two-week event during the July 1 and July 8 episodes of NXT on the USA Network. Both episodes were taped on July 1.

Impact of the COVID-19 pandemic
As a result of the COVID-19 pandemic that began affecting the industry in mid-March, WWE had to present the majority of its programming from a behind closed doors set. Broadcasts of NXT were subsequently held at NXT's home base of Full Sail University in Winter Park, Florida.

Storylines
The event included matches that resulted from scripted storylines, where wrestlers portrayed heroes, villains, or less distinguishable characters in scripted events that built tension and culminated in a wrestling match or series of matches. Results were predetermined by WWE's writers on the NXT brand, while storylines were produced on WWE's weekly television show, NXT.

One scheduled match for the July 8 broadcast was a champion vs. champion winner takes all match between NXT Champion Adam Cole and NXT North American Champion Keith Lee. The two-night event went head-to-head against All Elite Wrestling's Fyter Fest, which was held on the same nights. Due to the COVID-19 pandemic, both nights of the 2020 event were held behind closed doors at NXT's home base of Full Sail University in Winter Park, Florida.

Results
Night 1 (July 1)

Night 2 (July 8)

Notes

References

External links 
 

The Great American Bash
2020 in professional wrestling in Florida
2020 in professional wrestling
July 2020 events in the United States
Professional wrestling in Florida
WWE NXT